Anna Lilliehöök (born 1947) is a Swedish politician of the Moderate Party. 
Lilliehöök represented Stockholm Municipality in the Riksdag from 1998 to 2010. Lilliehöök was a member of the Riksdag's Defense Committee (1998–2002), Social Security Committee (2002–2006), and Finance Committee (2006–2010). From 1992 to 1994, Lilliehöök was a member of the Stockholm County Council. Lilliehöök is a civilekonom. 
Lilliehöök belongs to the Swedish nobility through marriage.

References

External links 
Anna Lilliehöök at the Riksdag website

1947 births
Living people
Members of the Riksdag from the Moderate Party
Women members of the Riksdag
Members of the Riksdag 2002–2006
21st-century Swedish women politicians